FC Shakhtar Donetsk junior squads and academy are junior teams of Ukrainian professional football club Shakhtar Donetsk. 

There are two teams that participate in the junior championships of the Ukrainian Premier League. Four more teams participate in the Ukrainian Youth Football League.

Brief history
FC Shakhtar Donetsk has been fielding its reserve (junior) team since 1949 when the club returned to the Soviet top league (Pervaya Gruppa). In 1953 the club established its own training center in Kirsha. Since discontinuation of the Soviet Top League in 1991, Shakhtar reserve team was discontinued as well. 

In 1992 based on reserve team there was created FC Shakhtar-2 Donetsk which was based in Kostiantynivka and entered competitions among professional teams the 1992 Ukrainian First League.

At the end of 1990s there were more discussions about revival of junior competitions. In 1998 there was created All-Ukrainian youth football championship among senior and junior youth teams and which in 2000 Shakhtar junior youth team won. In 2001 there was established the DYuFL (Youth Football League) and teams of Vyshcha Liha (Higher League) were mandated to field four teams in each age group competition (U-14, U-15, U-16, U-17). In 2002 there also was established provisional competitions among under-19 teams.

Honours
 UEFA Youth League (Under-19)
 Runners-up (1): 2014–15

 Soviet Top League (reserves)
 Winners (2): 1967, 1969
 Runners-up (3): 1968, 1976, 1977

 Ukrainian Under-21 Championship
 Winners (4): 2008–09, 2010–11, 2011–12, 2017–18
 Runners-up (5): 2006–07, 2009–10, 2013–14, 2015–16, 2016–17

 Ukrainian Under-19 Championship
 Winners (1): 2014–15
 Runners-up (2): 2013–14, 2017–18

 Ukrainian Under-17 Championship
 Winners (7): 2002–03, 2003–04, 2007–08, 2010–11, 2011–12, 2012–13, 2017–18
 Runners-up (2): 2004–05, 2009–10

Current squad 
.

International competitions
Since 2013 Shakhtar's junior team competed at the UEFA Youth League. Its first game it played on 17 September 2013 at the Zubieta Facilities against Real Sociedad Juvenil. The team played in every season except for the 2016–17 season. Since 2015 Shakhtar fields its junior team along with its main rival Dynamo. 

In 2014 Shakhtar's juniors reached the UEFA Youth League finals, but lost it.

League and cup history

Shakhtar U-21 / doubles

Shakhtar U-19

Notable players
 Vladyslav Kulach
 Artur Miranyan
 Artur Zahorulko

See also
Kirsha Training Centre
FC Shakhtar-2 Donetsk

References

Youth
Youth football in Ukraine
Football academies in Ukraine
UEFA Youth League teams
Sport schools in Ukraine